Jieyuanxidao Station, is a station of Line 2 western section of the Tianjin Metro.

References

External links

Railway stations in Tianjin
Railway stations in China opened in 2012
Tianjin Metro stations